The Anglican Diocese of Bari is one of eleven within the Anglican Province of Kaduna, itself one of 14 provinces within the Church of Nigeria. The current bishop is Idris Zubairu.

Notes

Dioceses of the Province of Kaduna
 
Bari